Forever (stylised as FOREVER) is the debut studio album by Swedish DJ and record producer Alesso. It was released on 22 May 2015 by Def Jam Recordings. Alesso has said of the album, "It's been an indescribable journey to get this album together. I'm so proud of it, it's very personal to me, it's a dream to me that this has come together and I do what I love every single day. I hope my fans will enjoy it as much as I enjoyed making it and all the memories and emotions that went into every song. Thank you to everyone who helped me on this incredible journey and this is just the beginning."

Critical reception 

Forever received mixed reviews from music critics. At Metacritic, which assigns a normalized rating out of 100 to reviews from mainstream critics, the album received an average score of 53, which indicates "mixed or average reviews", based on 4 reviews.

Track listing

Notes
  signifies a co-producer
  signifies an additional producer
 "If It Wasn't for You" features uncredited vocals by Simon Strömstedt.
"In My Blood" features uncredited vocals by John Martin.
"Cool" contains samples of Kylie Minogue's 2010 single "Get Outta My Way".
The deluxe edition was available everywhere excluding North America.

Charts

Weekly charts

Year-end charts

Certifications

References

2015 debut albums
Alesso albums
Def Jam Recordings albums
Albums produced by Calvin Harris
Albums produced by Benny Blanco
Albums produced by Ryan Tedder